Niyazqulular is a village in the Jabrayil District of Azerbaijan. It was occupied by the Armenian forces in 1993. The Army of Azerbaijan recaptured the village on or around October 19, 2020.

References 

Populated places in Jabrayil District